Gwyn Jones may refer to:

 Gwyn Jones (author) (1907–1999), Welsh historian, translator and story writer
 Gwyn Jones (figure skater) (born 1939), South African pair skater
 Gwyn Jones (footballer, born 1912), footballer for Merthyr Town, Huddersfield Town, Rochdale, Stockport County & Tranmere Rovers
 Gwyn Jones (footballer, born 1935), Welsh footballer for Wolverhampton Wanderers and Bristol Rovers
 Gwyn Jones (physicist) (1917–2006), Welsh physics professor and director of the National Museum of Wales
 Gwyn Jones (rugby union) (born 1972), former Wales international rugby union player
 Gwyn Hughes Jones, Welsh operatic tenor

See also
 Gwyneth Jones (disambiguation)
 T. Gwynn Jones (1871–1949), Welsh poet